The 1994 Glendalough state by-election was a by-election for the seat of Glendalough in the Legislative Assembly of Western Australia held on 19 March 1994. It was triggered by the resignation of Carmen Lawrence (the sitting Labor member and a former premier) on 14 February 1994, in order to contest the House of Representatives at the 1994 Fremantle by-election. The Labor Party retained Glendalough at the by-election, with their candidate, Michelle Roberts, recording 52.7 percent of the two-party-preferred vote.

Background
Carmen Lawrence had held Glendalough for the Labor Party since its creation at the 1989 state election. She had previously held Subiaco since 1986. Lawrence replaced Peter Dowding as Labor leader (and thus as premier) in February 1990, but her government was defeated at the 1993 state election. She resigned from state parliament on 14 February 1994, in order to contest the House of Representatives at the Fremantle by-election on 12 March. Following Lawrence's resignation, the writ for the by-election was issued on 17 February, with the close of nominations on 25 February. Polling day was on 19 March, with the writ returned on 30 March.

Lawrence won the Fremantle by-election held a week earlier, on 12 March, and both by-elections were contested by independent Raymond Conder.

Results

 Connolly and Hands recorded the same number of first-preference votes, but Connolly's preferences were distributed first.

Aftermath
Glendalough was abolished at the 1996 state election, and Roberts transferred to the new seat of Midland. She was a government minister between 2001 and 2008, under premiers Geoff Gallop and Alan Carpenter, and in 2015 became Western Australia's longest-serving female parliamentarian. Lawrence was successful in her attempt to transfer to the House of Representatives, and was appointed to the federal ministry almost immediately after entering parliament, where she served until the Labor government's defeat at the 1996 federal election.

See also
 List of Western Australian state by-elections
 Women in the Western Australian Legislative Assembly

References

Western Australian state by-elections
Glendalough state by-election
Glendalough state by-election
1990s in Perth, Western Australia